Ghalati is a 2019 Pakistani romantic drama television series premiered on ARY Digital on December 19, 2019. It is directed by Saba Hameed and written by Asma Sayani. Produced by Humayun Saeed under Six Sigma Plus, it stars Hira Mani and Affan Waheed.

Plot 
The show revolves around the life of Zaira and Saad, a married couple whose marriage life deteriorates quickly due to Saad's anger and constant threatening of divorcing her which ends up happening knowingly yet unknowingly by Saad. Zaitoon (Saad's mother) always takes it upon herself to start problems between Saad and Zaira because she feels that Zaira is dangerous as she is educated and strong headed girl.

Cast 
Hira Mani as Zaira
Affan Waheed as Saad
Anoushay Abbasi as Maira
Faris Shafi as Sohail
Mehar Bano as Shanzay
Sana Askari as Aliyah
Saba Hameed as Zaitoon; Saad's mother
Fareeda Shabbir as Samina; Zaitoon's sister
Saba Faisal as Nafeesa; Zaira's mother
Shehryar Zaidi as Shabbir; Zaira's father
Natalia Awais as Guriya; Saad's cousin
Usama Khan as Fahad

Soundtrack

The original soundtrack is sung by Nabeel Shaukat Ali and composed by Naveed Nashad on lyrics of Imran Raza. Reviewer from The News International wrote, "With Naveed Nashad’s gripping OST and Imran Raza's lyrics, one can get a song that can be listened to whenever mood is down".

Awards and nominations

References

External links 
Official website

Pakistani drama television series
Urdu-language television shows
ARY Digital original programming
2019 Pakistani television series debuts